Seryu Station is a station on Line 1 of the Seoul Metropolitan Subway.  It is in southern Suwon. Near Seryu Station lies Suwon Air Base, home to the ROKAF's 10th Fighter Wing. It is between Suwon station and Byeongjeom station.

Gallery

References

Seoul Metropolitan Subway stations
Metro stations in Suwon
Railway stations opened in 2003